Bismuth tribromide is an inorganic compound of bismuth and bromine with the chemical formula BiBr3.

Preparation
It may be formed by the reaction of bismuth oxide and hydrobromic acid.

Bismuth tribromide can also be produced by the direct oxidation of bismuth in bromine.

Structure
Bismuth tribromide adopts two different structures in the solid state: a low-temperature polymorph α-BiBr3 that is stable below 158 °C and a high-temperature polymorph β-BiBr3 that is stable above this temperature. Both polymorphs are monoclinic but α-BiBr3 is in space group P21/a whereas β-BiBr3 is in C2/m. α-BiBr3 consists of pyramidal molecules whereas β-BiBr3 is polymeric and adopts the AlCl3 structure. BiBr3 is the only group 15 trihalide that can adopt both molecular and polymeric structures.

Reactivity
Bismuth bromide is highly water-soluble. It is a Lewis acid and accepts bromide ions to form monomeric and oligomeric anionic complexes (bromobismuthates), e.g. [BiBr6]3−, [Bi2Br10]4−,n and n.

References

Bismuth compounds
Bromides
Metal halides